The Southeastern District is a district of the Virginia High School League.  The schools in the Southeastern District compete in the 6A, 5A, and 4A divisions.

The members of the Southeastern District are all the public high schools in Chesapeake City and Suffolk City.  This is one of the faster-growing regions in the Commonwealth.

Member schools
Deep Creek High School of Chesapeake, Virginia
Grassfield High School of Chesapeake, Virginia
Great Bridge High School of Chesapeake, Virginia
Hickory High School of Chesapeake, Virginia
Indian River High School of Chesapeake, Virginia
King's Fork High School of Suffolk, Virginia
Lakeland High School of Suffolk, Virginia
Nansemond River High School of Suffolk, Virginia
Oscar Smith High School  of Chesapeake, Virginia
Western Branch High School of Chesapeake, Virginia

Former Members
 Cradock High School (Portsmouth)
 Woodrow Wilson High School (Portsmouth)
 Manor High School (Portsmouth)
 IC Norcom High School (Portsmouth)
 Churchland High School (Portsmouth)

Education in Suffolk, Virginia
Sports in Hampton Roads
Virginia High School League
Education in Chesapeake, Virginia